Unwona (also Unuuona, Unwano) was a medieval Bishop of Leicester.

Unwona was consecrated between 781 and 785. He died between 801 and 803.

Unwona appears as a witness to records of ecclesiastical councils and Mercian royal charters twenty times between 785 and around 800. Unwona's name is rare or even unique among Anglo-Saxon names, and seems to derive from Old English wana ('lack'), and to mean 'not lacking'. It is possible that he was the addressee of a letter sent in 797 by Alcuin of York to one 'Speratus'; the letter includes Alcuin's most famous injunction: 'verba Dei legantur in sacerdotali convivio: ibi decet lectorem audiri, non citharistam, sermones patrum, non carmina gentilium. Quid Hinieldus cum Christo?' ('Let God's words be read at the episcopal dinner-table. It is right that a reader should be heard,  not  a harpist,  patristic  discourse, not  pagan  song.  What  has  Hinield to do with Christ?').

Citations

References

External links
 

Bishops of Leicester (ancient)
8th-century English bishops